George William Outram Addleshaw (1 December 1906–14 June 1982) was Dean of Chester in the third quarter of the 20th century. He was born on 1 December 1906 and educated at Bromsgrove and Trinity College, Oxford. Ordained in 1931, he was initially a Curate at Highfield Parish Church, Southampton. Following this he became Vice Principal of St Chad's College, Durham, then a Canon Residentiary at York Minster before his elevation to the Deanery of Chester. A man with extensive knowledge of church architecture,  he died on 14 June 1982.

In the 1950s, Addleshaw was living at 10 Precentor's Court, adjacent to York Minster.

References

External links
 Bibliographic directory from Project Canterbury

1906 births
1982 deaths
Alumni of Ripon College Cuddesdon
Alumni of Trinity College, Oxford
Deans of Chester
People educated at Bromsgrove School